"Crank That (Soulja Boy)" is the debut single by American rapper Soulja Boy Tell'em. It served as the lead single from his debut studio album, souljaboytellem.com (2007) and accompanies the Soulja Boy dance. The song is recognized by its looping steelpan riff. It caused what has been called "the biggest dance fad since the Macarena", with an instructional YouTube video for the dance surpassing 27 million views by early 2008.

"Crank That (Soulja Boy)" spent seven weeks at number one on the U.S. Billboard Hot 100 in the fall of 2007, and was the number 21 on the Rolling Stone magazine's list of the 100 Best Songs of 2007. The song received a nomination for a Grammy Award for Best Rap Song at the 50th Grammy Awards but lost to Kanye West's song "Good Life".  On January 6, 2008, it became the first song ever to sell 3 million digital copies in the US. In 2009 it was named the 23rd most successful song of the 2000s on the Billboard Hot 100 Songs of the Decade. It had sold 5,080,000 downloads in the US by February 2014.
Outside of the United States, "Crank That (Soulja Boy)" peaked within the top ten of the charts in Australia, Belgium, Canada, New Zealand, and the United Kingdom.

Production and release
Soulja Boy—real name DeAndre Way—was raised between Atlanta, Georgia and Batesville, Mississippi. In his teens, an uncle gifted him a demo copy of FL Studio. In 2005, he registered an account with the online music service SoundClick, and began sharing his songs with others. He became relentlessly devoted to increasing his name recognition using the Web, expanding his reach to MySpace and blogs. He misled users of the peer-to-peer platform LimeWire by changing his songs' metadata to whatever song was popular at the moment in order to reach more listeners. Within time, the rapper began to garner a significant number of streams and shares. His songs stylistically emulate the sound of Atlanta hip hop in the mid-aughts, particularly the briefly-popular snap music fad.

In 2006, the phrase "crank dat"—a lyrical invitation to dance—became a small phenomenon in mainly online hip-hop circles; users uploaded videos of different dance routines set to an increasing number of songs with the title phrase. An early version of the song, titled "Crank Dat Dance Remix", was uploaded June 14, 2006 to SoundClick; another iteration, titled "Crank Dat Jump Rope", debuted a month later. "Crank That"—as publicly titled upon major-label release—was self-produced by Way in the unregistered demo copy of FL Studio, utilizing only the software's most basic library of sounds. The song is musically repetitive and sparse, incorporating snaps, a steel drum pattern, centered around a meaningless chant: "Yoooouuuulll!" Way reportedly wrote and recorded the song in ten minutes. The original recording of the song was made at Way's home, and subsequently revised and updated for its final release. Way first posted the song, along with an instructional how-to, to his MySpace on February 25, 2007.

The song grew in popularity steadily, attracting the attention of music producer Mr. Collipark, who initially balked at its unexpected recognition. The song led Soulja Boy to sign with Collipark's imprint on Interscope Records, which released the final, professionally-recorded song on May 2, 2007 in the U.S. (a global released followed on June 27).

Dance and music video

Inspired by recent dance crazes that had popularized some rappers from Atlanta, Soulja Boy (DeAndre Way) and his friends invented the dance moves that gave rise to "Crank That": As summarized by The Wall Street Journal, "dancers bounce back on their heels, ripple their hands, crank their wrists like motorcyclists, then lunge into a Superman pose".

The music video (directed by Dale Resteghini) begins in the "ColliPark Residence" with Sincostan Ak Flame and J Fresh imitating the Soulja Boy dance. Mr. Collipark takes a keen interest in the children's movements, leading him to contact Soulja Boy in an attempt to sign him up to "Collipark Records". His instinct is confirmed when he notices a number of people performing the dance, en route to meeting with Soulja Boy.

This video premiered on BET's 106 & Park on August 9, 2007. It features Bow Wow,  Omarion, Unk, Baby D, Jibbs, Rich Boy and others doing the signature "Soulja Boy Dance".

Legacy
"Crank That" has been widely regarded as among the earliest digital hit singles of its kind.  Music journalist Tom Breihan devoted a chapter of his 2022 book The Number Ones to examining the legacy of "Crank That", with particular regards to Soulja Boy's self-driven marketing and nascent online popularity. Breihan considers Drake, Lil Nas X, and Nicki Minaj his potential progeny, writing:

Soulja Boy himself has argued the point, remarking in an interview with Complex: "I motherfuckin’ showed you how to get famous from your bedroom on the internet! [...] They’ll talk about it in history books later."

Charts

Weekly charts

Year-end charts

Decade-end charts

All-time charts

Certifications

References

2007 songs
2007 debut singles
Soulja Boy songs
Songs written by Soulja Boy
Songs about dancing
Billboard Hot 100 number-one singles
Interscope Records singles
Novelty and fad dances
Snap songs
Internet memes introduced in 2007
Music videos directed by Dale Resteghini
Hip hop dance